Bradwell Lodge is a country house in the village of Bradwell-on-Sea, on the Dengie Peninsula in Essex, England. Originally a Tudor rectory, in the 18th century the house was purchased by the Reverend Sir Henry Bate Dudley. Bate Dudley engaged John Johnson, Surveyor of the County of Essex, to build a large Neoclassical extension. In the 20th century, the lodge was the home of Tom Driberg. Bradwell remains a private residence. It is a Grade II* listed building.

History
Bradwell Lodge stands close to the Church of St Thomas in the village of Bradwell-on-Sea. The origins of the house are a moated manor house dating from Tudor times. By the 18th century the lodge had become the village rectory. In the later half of that century, the lodge was bought by the Reverend Sir Henry Bate Dudley (1745-1824), a Church of England minister. In addition to his religious duties, Bate Dudley edited one newspaper, the Morning Post and ran another, the Morning Herald, courting controversy and enduring imprisonment as the "most notorious editor in London." He wrote plays and was a close friend of both the actor David Garrick and the artist Thomas Gainsborough, who twice painted his portrait. He was also a famous duellist, gaining the nickname, "The Fighting Parson".  

Between 1781-1786 Bate Dudley engaged John Johnson (1732-1814) to embellish the original manor house with a large extension to the south side. Johnson held the post of Surveyor of the County of Essex and was a prolific architect of country houses and public buildings throughout the county, as well as a number of aristocratic townhouses in London.  

In 1939, the lodge was purchased by Tom Driberg. Driberg had made his name as the gossip columnist William Hickey in the Daily Express and in 1942 was elected member of parliament for Maldon, the Essex constituency in which Bradwell lodge was sited. The house was unavailable to him during the Second World War as it was requisitioned by the Royal Air Force to serve as an officers' mess for the nearby RAF Bradwell Bay. Driberg returned to the lodge after the war and brought his new wife, Ena Mary Binfield, there in 1951. Their marriage had surprised Driberg's friends and connections as he was openly homosexual; some suspected that the partnership was in part to provide cover for his sexual orientation, as well as a chatelaine for his substantial country house.  

The grounds contain a rare Gingko biloba tree presented to Driberg when Chairman of the Labour Party by the Premier of the People's Republic of China, Zhou Enlai. In 1976 Driberg was elevated to the peerage as Baron Bradwell of Bradwell juxta Mare in the County of Essex. He died three weeks later and is buried in the graveyard of St Thomas's Church, near to the lodge. Bradwell Lodge remains a private residence, and has been sold on a number of occasions in the 21st century.

Architecture and description
Bradwell Lodge is formed of two main structures, the remnant of the original Tudor manor house, and the 18th-century block added by Bate Dudley. The former is a two-storey building of timber and brick. The latter is again of two-storeys but of a "clearly metropolitan"  Neoclassical style. The interior contains decoration in the style of Angelica Kaufman and other elements were undertaken by Robert Smirke. John Bettley, in his 2007 Essex volume of the Pevsner Buildings of England series, also notes the traditional attribution of parts of the interior design scheme to Robert Adam but states that there is no documentary evidence to support the claim. A portico on the south front was added by Quinlan Terry in 2005. The Georgian extension is topped with a belvedere.  

Bradwell Lodge is a Grade II* listed building. The walled garden and the former coach house and stables are listed Grade II.

Footnotes

References

Sources
 
 
 
 

 

Grade II* listed houses
Grade II* listed buildings in Essex
Buildings and structures in Maldon District